Jewish Community Councils (JCCs) are a form of local Jewish organization with the purpose of safeguarding Jewish rights, and assisting local residents. Jewish Community Councils were mostly formed in the 1940s.

Activities
Jewish organizations are locally based, though they do play a role in coordinating activities with national Jewish organizations. JCCs focus on assisting local Jewish community and safeguarding Jewish rights. Recently, Jewish Community Councils have helped out locals in the aftermath of Hurricane Sandy.

Jewish Community Councils
Jewish Community Councils are located in a number of cities in the United States. In New York City alone, there are 24 JCCs.

New York
According to the Met Council's JCC listings, there are 24 Jewish Community Councils in New York City's five boroughs.

Bronx
Bronx Jewish Community Council (BJCC)
Concourse-North Bronx JCC
Jewish Community Council of Co-op City
Jewish Community Council of Pelham Parkway
Jewish Community Council of Parkchester Unionport
Jewish Community Council of Riverdale

Brooklyn
Jewish Community Council of Bensonhurst (Bensonhurst COJO)
Jewish Community Council of Boro Park
Jewish Community Council of Crown Heights (CHJCC)
Jewish Community Council of Greater Coney Island (JCCGCI)
Jewish Community Council of Canarsie
Jewish Community Council of Flatbush (Flatbush COJO)
Jewish Community Council of Kings Bay
Jewish Community Council of Marine Park
Jewish Community Council of Shorefront
Jewish Community Council of Williamsburg (Williamsburg UJO)

Manhattan
Jewish Community Council of Washington Heights-Inwood
United Jewish Council of the East Side (UJCES)
Jewish Community Council of the Westside (Westside COJO)

Queens
Jewish Community Council of Flushing
Jewish Community Council of Rockaway Peninsula
Jewish Community Council of Jackson Heights & Elmhurst
Jewish Community Council of Queens

Staten Island
Jewish Community Council of Staten Island (Staten Island COJO)

Australia
Jewish Community Council of Victoria

References

Jewish organizations